The Men's Greco-Roman 130 kg at the 1988 Summer Olympics as part of the wrestling program were held at the Sangmu Gymnasium, Seongnam from September 20 to September 22. The wrestlers are divided into 2 groups. The winner of each group decided by a double-elimination system.

Medalists

Results 
Legend
FR — Won by forfeit
D2 — Both wrestlers disqualified for passivity
DQ — Disqualification from the entire competition
P0 — Won by passivity, scoring zero points
P1 — Won by passivity, while leading by 1–11 points margin
PA — Win by injury default or withdrawal
PO — Win by decision (1–11 points margin) and loser has no technical points
PP — Win by decision (1–11 points margin) and loser has technical points
PS — Won by passivity, while leading by 12–14 points margin
SO — Win by superiority (12–14 points margin) and loser has no technical points
SP — Win by superiority (12–14 points margin) and loser has technical points
ST — Win by technical superiority (15 points margin)
TF — Win by fall
CP — Classification points

Eliminatory round

Group A

Group B

Finals

Final standing

References

External links
Official Report

Greco-Roman 99kg